This is a list of markets in Moscow. The city has a vibrant history of formal and informal markets.

Operational Markets 

 Hotel Sevastopol - Run by Afghan traders.
 Izmailovsky Market - Souvenir and flea market and a culture center.
 Gorbushka - Electronics market.

Defunct Markets 
 Luzhniki market
 Cherkizovsky market

Retail markets in Russia